The following is a partial list of broadcasts aired on Telefís Éireann (Ireland's first television channel) from its launch in 1961. A list of broadcasts on its (later) sister channel may be found elsewhere.

Home-produced programming

Current
 Nine O'Clock News (1961–present)
 Six One News (1962–present)
 One O'Clock News (1989–present)
 The Late Late Show (1962–present)
 Fair City (1989–present)
 Would You Believe  (1990s–present)
 Prime Time (1992–present)
 Nationwide (1993–present)
 Nuacht (1995–present)
 Reeling in the Years (1999–present)
 The Week in Politics (2006–present)
 At Your Service (2008–present)
 Mrs. Brown's Boys (2011–present)

Former

Young people's programming
Action Station Saturday
Aillio
An Baile Beag
Anything Goes
Aunty Poppy's Storytime
Bábaró
Bishop Fulton Sheen
Borderline
Bosco
Bosco: The Animated Series
Brogeen Follows the Magic Tune
Buntús Cainte
C-P & Qwikstitch
Dáithí Lacha
Dempsey's Den
Deep Fried Swamp
Dilín Ó Deamhas
Fortycoats & Co.
Jump Around
Look Around
The Morbegs
Murphy agus a Cháirde
Newsline
Out on Your Own
Paint for Fun
Pajo's Junkbox
Pat's Chat
Pat's Hat
Pat's Pals
Scratch Saturday
Seoirse agus Beartlai
Ten Minute Tales
TV Gaga
Video Time
Wanderly Wagon
Youngline
Zoo Logic

0–9
7 Days
30 Years A-Glowing
100 Years
50,000 Secret Journeys

A
A hAon is a hAon Sin a hAon
A. J. F. O'Reilly: An Irish Lion
Access - Community Television
Act of Betrayal
The Adam Faith Show
Ag Déanamh Ceoil
Airc
Aiséirí
Aisling Gheal
Alert
…and finally France
Amuigh Faoin Spéir
An Fear agus a Chuid Ceoil
The Angelus
Anissimov Conducts Beethoven
Anois is Arís
Anthology
Aria with Thirty Variations: The Goldberg Variations
Art Attacks
As the Crow Flies
As Zozimus Said
At the Embankment
Atty Bunting

B
Ballad Sheet
A Ballad Tour of Ireland
The Ballroom of Romance
Ballymagash
Barry Mason, Songwriter
Be My Guest
Beirt Eile
Bestseller
The Big Top
Billy Boyle in Magical Christmas Tour
Billy's Magic Christmas Box
The Birthday Show
Blas na Fraince
The Blue Note
Bóithrín na Smaointe
Booklines
Borderlines
Bracken
Brandy Snap
Bring Down the Lamp
Broadsheet
Bull Island
By Meadow and Mountain/Mountain and Meadow

C
Cabin Fever
Caught in a Free State
Challenging Times
Check Up
Closedown
Coiscéim
Comely Maidens

D
Discovery

E
Ear to the Ground
Exhibit A

F
The Fall
Farrell
Féach
 The Fenians
Folio
For Better, For Worse
For Better Or Worse
For One Night Only
Framed!

G
Garda Patrol
 The Garden
The Gay Byrne Music Show
Glenroe
Good Afternoon
 Greenfingers

H
Hall's Pictorial Weekly
Hands
Hands On
The Hanging Gale
Hanly's People
Haughey
Head 2 Toe
Hidden History
The Humours of Donnybrook

I
In Search of the Pope's Children
Insurrection
Ireland's Generation Game
Irish Railways

J
Jackpot

K
Know Your Sport

L
Labhair Gaeilge Linn
Leader's Questions
Léargas
Legal Eagles
Lifting the Veil – The Politics of Television
Live at 3
Love Is

M
Mailbag
Mart and Market
Mass
The Meaning of Life
Messiah
Millennium Eve: Celebrate 2000
The Mountain Lark
Murphy's Micro-Quiz-M

N
Newsbeat
No Comment
Nodlaig McCarthy with...
Notice to Quit

O
Oireachtas Report
 On The Street Where You Live
One to One
Out of the Blue
Outlook
Out of Nowhere

P
 Pattern's
Paper Chase
The Person in Question
The Politicians
The Politics Programme
A Prayer at Bedtime
Prime Time Investigates
Public Account
Public Enemy

Q
Questions and Answers

R
Radharc
Rapid Roulette
Read Write Now
The Riordans
Room Outside

S
Scannal!
School Around the Corner
Secret Sights
A Sense of Excellence
Seven Ages
Simply Music
The Spike
The State of Us
Strumpet City
Súil Thart

T
Tales of Kilnavarna
Tangents
Today Tonight
Tolka Row
To the Waters and the Wild
The Tony Kenny Show
Top Ace '82
Townlands
Tracks and Trails
Treasure Island
The Treaty
Trom agus Éadrom
True Lives
Tuesday File
Turas Teanga
TV50

U
Up and Running
Up for the Match

V
Video File
The View

W
Waterways
What's My Line
When Reason Sleeps
Whistleblower
Word in Action
 Why?

Y
The Year of the French

Z
 The Zoo

Imported

Current
Telefís Éireann airs a small selection of imports, mostly sitcom repeats, soap operas and other dramas. These include:
Doctors
EastEnders (since 2001)
Keeping Up Appearances
Last of the Summer Wine
Mr. Bean
Mr. Mercedes
Neighbours
Shortland Street (since 1996)

Former
Telefís Éireann has aired:
1915
The 20th Century
The 7th Heaven
8 Simple Rules
'Allo 'Allo!
The A-Team
Absolutely Fabulous
Ace Crawford, Private Eye
The Adventurer
The Adventures of Brisco County, Jr.
The Adventures of Robin Hood
The Adventures of the Black Stallion
Agatha Christie's Partners in Crime
Agatha Christie's Poirot
After Henry
ALF
Alias Smith and Jones
All Creatures Great and Small
All the Green Year
Alfred Hitchcock Presents
Almost Perfect
Aly Bain and Friends
Amazing Stories
Ancient Warriors
Are You Being Served?
Ark on the Move
Around the World in 80 Days (1989 miniseries)
The Ascent of Man
At Last the 1948 Show
Australia Wild
A.J. Wentworth, B.A.
Bailey's Bird
Bakersfield P.D.
Ballykissangel
Barbary Coast
Barnaby Jones
Batman
Baywatch
Baywatch Hawaii
The Beachcombers
Bearcats!
The Beatles Anthology
The Beiderbecke Connection
Benji's Very Own Christmas Story
The Benny Hill Show
Benson
The Beverly Hillbillies
Bewitched
Beyond 2000
The Big Pull
Big Sky
The Big Valley
The Bionic Woman
Bit of a Do
The Black Forest Clinic
Bless Me, Father
Blood and Honor: Youth Under Hitler
Blue Heelers
Bonanza
Boon
Born Free
The Brady Bunch
Brat Farrar
Brideshead Revisited
Bring 'Em Back Alive
The Brittas Empire
Brooklyn South
The Brothers
Burke's Law (1994 series)
Buongiorno Italia
B.J. and the Bear
Cagney and Lacey
The Campbells
Campion
Cannon
Carson's Law
The Cavanaughs
The Cedar Tree
Charlie Chaplin
Charlie's Angels (1976 series)
The Charmer
Cheers
The Cheryl Ladd Special
The Cheryl Ladd Special: Souvenirs
China Beach
CHiPs
Christmas Lilies of the Field
The Cinder Path
Coach
Code R
Cody
The Colbys
Columbo
The Commish
The Computer Programme
Consuming Passions
Coronation Street (1961–2001)
The Cosby Show
Country G.P.
A Country Practice
Cowboy in Africa
Cracker
Crayon Shin-chan
Dad's Army
Daktari
Dallas (1978 series)
Danger Bay
Daniel Boone
The Danny Kaye Show
Darkroom
Darling Buds of May
The Day of the Triffids (1981 series)
The Days and Nights of Molly Dodd
Deadly Harvest
Death Valley Days
Degrees of Error
Delia Smith's Cookery Course
Dellaventura
Dennis the Menace (1959 series)
Designing Women
Diagnosis: Murder
The Dick Emery Show
The Dick Van Dyke Show
The Dirtwater Dynasty
The Disney Hour
Disneyland
The Donna Reed Show
Double Trouble
Dr. Finlay's Casebook
Dr Quinn, Medicine Woman
The Drew Carey Show
The Dukes of Hazzard
The Dunera Boys
Dynasty
Edge of Darkness
Emmerdale Farm
Emily of New Moon
The Equalizer
ER
Ever Decreasing Circles
The Everglades
Executive Stress
Everybody Loves Raymond
F Troop
Falcon Crest
The Fall and Rise of Reginald Perrin
Fame
The Fall Guy
A Family at War
Family Matters
Family Ties
The Famous Teddy Z
The Fantastic Journey
Farmhouse Kitchen
Father Brown
Father, Dear Father
Father Dowling Mysteries
Father Knows Best
Fawlty Towers
Ffizz
The Fifth Missile
The Flame Trees of Thika
The Flight of the Heron
The Flintstones
Flipper (1964 series)
The Flip Wilson Show
Floyd on Fish
The Flying Doctors
Flying Plutonium
Follow Me
Forever Green
The Forsyte Saga
Fortune Hunter
Frasier
Fresh Fields
The Fresh Prince of Bel-Air
Full Circle with Michael Palin
Funny Man
The Gangster Chronicles
Gardeners' Diary
Gemini Man
George and Leo
George and Mildred
George
Get Smart
Gloss
The Golden Girls
The Golden Palace
Gone to Texas
The Goodies
The Good Life (1971 series)
The Good Life (1975 series)
The Great Escape II: The Untold Story
Great Expectations (1981 series)
Great Railway Journeys
The Greatest American Hero
Greatest Heroes of the Bible
Green Acres
Gunsmoke
G.P.
Hannay
Happy Days
Happy Ever After
Harbormaster
The Hardy Boys/Nancy Drew Mysteries
Harry and the Hendersons
Hart to Hart
Hawaii Five-0 (1968 series)
Head of the Class
Heartbeat (British version)
The Henderson Kids
Here's Lucy
Highway to Heaven
The Hill of the Red Fox
Hill Street Blues
The Hitchhiker
The Hogan Family
Hold the Back Page
Hollywood
Home Improvement
Home to Roost
Honey, I Shrunk the Kids: The TV Show
The Honeymooners
Hooperman
Hoover vs. The Kennedys
Hotel
House of Carabus
The House of Eliott
Huckleberry Finn and His Friends
I Dream of Jeannie
I Spy
The Incredible Hulk (1978 series)
Inside China
Inside Japan
The Invisible Man
In Search of...
In the Heat of the Night
The Irish R.M.
Iron Horse
It Takes a Thief
Italianissimo
Jack & Jill
Jack and Mike
The Jack Benny Show
JAG
Jake and the Fatman
Jeeves and Wooster
J.J. Starbuck
Kate and Allie
Katts and Dog
Keeping Up Appearances
Knight Rider
Knots Landing
Kojak
Kontakte
Ladykillers
Land of the Giants
Law and Order
The Life and Times of Grizzly Adams
Life Begins at Forty
Life Goes On
Lillie
A Little Silver Trumpet
Little House on the Prairie
Logan's Run
Lois and Clark: The New Adventures of Superman
The London Embassy
The Long White Trail
Lost in Space
Lou Grant
Lovejoy
The Love Boat
Love Hurts
Love on a Branch Line
The Lucy Show
Ludwig van Beethoven
L.A. Law
MacGyver
The Mackenzie Affair
Mad About You
The Magician
Maigret (1992 series)
Major Dad
Magnum, P.I.
Man from Atlantis
The Man from U.N.C.L.E.
The Manhunter
Mancuso, F.B.I.
Mannix
Mapp and Lucia
Marcus Welby, M.D.
The Martian Chronicles
Mastermind
Match of the Day
Matlock
Matt Houston
Maya
May to December
McClain's Law
The Men Who Killed Kennedy
Miami Vice
Michael Ball
Midnight Caller
Midsomer Murders
Million Dollar Babies
Mission: Impossible (1966 series)
Mission: Impossible (1988 series)
The Mississippi
The Monkees
Monsters
The Monte Carlo Show
Moonlighting
The Morecambe & Wise Show
Mork and Mindy
The Mothers-in-Law
Mr. Bean
Mr. Belvedere
Mr. Deeds Goes to Town
The Muppet Show
Murder, She Wrote
Murphy Brown
Music City USA
My Cousin Rachel
My Friend Flicka
My Life and Times
My Wife Next Door
My World and Welcome to It
M*A*S*H
The Nancy Drew/Hardy Boys Mysteries
Paint Along with Nancy Kominsky
The Nanny 
The Nature of Things
Ned and Stacey
Nero Wolfe (1981 series)
Never the Twain
The New Adventures of Robin Hood
The New Avengers
The New Dick Van Dyke Show
Nightmare Cafe
The Nightmare Years
North and South
Nothing Scared
Nobody's Perfect
N.Y.P.D. Blue
The Odd Couple
Oh Happy Band!
The Onedin Line
One by One
One Foot in the Grave
Only Fools and Horses
Opportunity Knocks
The Oprah Winfrey Show
The Oregon Trail
Our Gang
Our House
Our John Willie
Our Mutual Friend
The Outcasts
The Over-the-Hill Gang
The Pallisers
The Paper Moon
Paradise
Perfect Scoundrels
Perry Mason
The Persuaders!
Petrocelli
The Phil Silvers Show
Playing Shakespeare
Poldark
Police Squad!
The Politician's Wife
Pottery Ladies
The Power and the Glory
The Powers of Matthew Star
The Practice
Pride and Prejudice (1980 series)
The Prisoner
The Prisoner of Zenda
Quirke
Q.E.D.
Rangi's Catch
Rags to Riches
The Ray Bradbury Theatre
Reasonable Doubts
Reckless
Red Fox
Remington Steele
Rich Man, Poor Man
Rings on Their Fingers
Rising Damp
Riverboat
The River Kings
The Road West
Robin of Sherwood
RoboCop: The Series
The Rockford Files
The Rolf Harris Show
Room for Two
Rowan & Martin's Laugh-In
Rude Health
Rumpole of the Bailey
Run, Buddy, Run
Rush
Ruth Rendell Mysteries
The Saint
Sale of the Century (UK version)
Salvage 1
Sam
Santa Barbara
Sapphire and Steel
Savannah
Scruples
Sea Hunt
SeaQuest DSV
Second Thoughts
The Secret Life of Machines
Scarecrow and Mrs. King
Scene of the Crime
The Sculptress
Shadow Chasers
Shannon's Deal
Shine on Harvey Moon
Sierra
Simon & Simon
The Simpsons
The Six Million Dollar Man
The Slap Maxwell Story
Small Sacrifices
Snowy River: The McGregor Saga
Some Mothers Do 'Ave 'Em
Sons and Daughters
The Sopranos
South Riding
Space: Above and Beyond
Space Precinct
Spencer: For Hire
Spin City
Star Trek: The Next Generation
Stingers
Stingray (1985 series)
Street Legal
St. Elsewhere
The Sullivans
Supertrain
Surgical Spirit
The Sweeney
Sweet Justice
Swiss Family Robinson (1974 series)
Sword of Honour
Taggart
Take Six Cooks
Take the High Road
A Tale of Two Cities
Tales from the Dark Side
Tales of the Unexpected
Tammy
Tarzan
Taxi
Technical Studies
Tenko
Terry and June
Testament to the Bushmen
The Thin Blue Line
Thunder Alley
Tiger on the Tiles
Tinker Tailor Soldier Spy
Tomorrow's World
Touched By an Angel
A Touch of Frost
To Serve Them All My Days
To the Manor Born
Top Club
Tracey Takes On...
Traffik
Twin Peaks
Two's Company
The Undersea World of Jacques Cousteau
Under Suspicion
Upstairs, Downstairs
Valerie
The Van Dyke Show
Veronica's Closet
The Vicar of Dibley
The Victorian Kitchen Garden
A Vous La France
Voyage to the Bottom of the Sea
Wait Till Your Father Gets Home
The Waltons
Wanted Dead or Alive
The Whiteoaks of Jalna
Who's the Boss?
Wildlife on One
Winnetka Road
Wings
Wish Me Luck
Wojeck
Wolf to the Slaughter
A Woman Named Jackie
Women of the Sun
The Wonder Years
The Wonderful World of Disney
Xena: Warrior Princess
Yan Can Cook
Yellowthread Street
The Yellow Rose
Yes, Prime Minister
The Young Indiana Jones Chronicles
Young Ramsay
The Young Riders
Zoya

Young children's programming
The 13 Ghosts of Scooby-Doo
3-2-1 Contact
The Adventure Machine
The Adventures of Babar
The Adventures of Black Beauty
The Adventures of Paddington Bear
The Adventures of Raggedy Ann and Andy
The Adventures of Robinson Crusoe
The Adventures of Skippy
The Adventures of Teddy Ruxpin
The Adventures of the Black Stallion
The Adventures of Rin Tin Tin
The Adventures of the Terrible Ten
The Adventures of Tintin
The Abbott and Costello Cartoon Show
Action Man (1995 series)
Aladdin
Alias the Jester
All Change
All the Green Year
The All-New Popeye Show
Alvin and the Chipmunks
Andy Robson
Animaland
Animals, Animals, Animals
The Animals of Farthing Wood
Around the World with Willy Fog
Arthur! and the Square Knights of the Round Table
Augie Doggie and Doggie Daddy
Babar
Babar and Father Christmas
The Baby's Storybook
Bailey's Bird
Bananas in Pyjamas
Barbapapa
The Barkleys
Barney
Barney & Friends
Batman: The Animated Series
The Battle of Billy's Pond
Battle of the Planets
Bay City
Bear in the Big Blue House
Beau Geste
Belle and Sebastian
Benji, Zax & the Alien Prince
The Berenstain Bears
Bertie the Bat
Bill and Ben
Bill and Bunny
The Biz
Blue Peter Special Assignment
Bobobobs
Bolek and Lolek
Bonkers
The Box of Delights
Boy Dominic
Bozo the Clown
Brendon Chase
Bright Sparks
The Bubblies
Buford and the Galloping Ghost
The Bugs Bunny Show
Bugs Bunny
A Bunch of Munsch
The Busy World of Richard Scarry
Butterfly Island
The Cabbage Patch Kids' First Christmas
Cadillacs and Dinosaurs
Cardcaptors
The Care Bears
The Cares of the Shore Patrol
Cattanooga Cats
Catweazle
Casper and Friends
Casper and the Angels
The CB Bears
Charlie Chalk
Children of Fire Mountain
Children of the New Forest
Children of the Stones
Children's Island
The Chinese Word for Horse
Chip 'n Dale: Rescue Rangers
Chocky's Challenge
Christmas Eve on Sesame Street
The Chronicles of Narnia
Circus Friends
Classical Disney Cartoons
The Clifton House Mystery
Clue Club
Cockleshell Bay
Coconuts
Codename Icarus
Come Midnight Monday
The Coral Island
Coral World
Count Duckula
The Count of Monte Cristo
The Country Mouse and the City Mouse Adventures
Curious George (original series)
Cyrano
Dai Mouse to the Rescue
Danger Mouse (1981 series)
Dastardly and Muttley in Their Flying Machines
Defenders of the Earth
Dennis the Menace and Gnasher
Deputy Dawg
Detective Bogey
The Devil and Daniel Mouse
Dinky Dog
Disney's Adventures of the Gummi Bears
Doctor Dolittle
Dog and Cat
Dog City
Dogtanian and the Three Muskehounds
Dominic
The Doombolt Chase
Doug
Drama 7
Dramarama
Droopy Dog
DuckTales (Original series)
The Eagle of the Ninth
The Edison Twins
Edward and Friends
The Electric Company
The Elephant Show
Emma and Grandpa
Enchanted Tales
Eureka
European Fairy Tales
European Folk Tales
Fables of the Green Forest
Falcon Island
Family Dog
Faerie Tale Theatre
The Famous Five (1978 series)
The Famous Five (1995 series)
Father Christmas
Felix the Cat
The Fenouillard Family
Festival of Family Classics
Fievel's American Tails
Fireman Sam
Filopat and Patafil
The Flintstone Kids
The Flockton Flyer
The Flying Kiwi
Follow Me (1977 series)
Follyfoot
Foo Foo
Forest Friends
The Four
Fraggle Rock
Freewheelers
Frosty's Winter Wonderland
Fudge
Funky Phantom
The Further Adventures of SuperTed
Galtar and the Golden Lance
Garfield and Friends
Garfield in the Rough
The Gemini Factor
Gentle Ben
George of the Jungle
George Shrinks
The Ghost Busters
The Ghost of Monk's Island
The Ghosts of Motley Hall
The Girl from Tomorrow
The Girl from Tomorrow Part II: Tomorrow's End
Goof Troop
The Great Grape Ape
Gumby
Habatales
Hannibal's Footsteps
Hattytown Tales
The Haunted School
The Haunting of Cassie Palmer
Haydaze
Heathcliff and Dingbat
Heathcliff and Marmaduke
Heckle and Jeckle
Heidi
Help!... It's the Hair Bear Bunch!
Henry's Leg
Here Come the Double Deckers
Here Comes Mumfie
He-Man & She-Ra: A Christmas Special
Hogg's Back
Hong Kong Phooey
The Hostages
The Houndcats
How
Hoze Houndz
Huckleberry Hound
Hunter's Gold
H.R. Pufnstuf
I am Weasel
Inch High Private Eye
Into the Labyrinth
Jabberjaw
Jackanory Playhouse
James Bond Jr.
Jana of the Jungle
Jennifer's Journey
Jeremy the Bear
The Jetsons
Jockey School
Jumbo Spencer
Just William (1977 series)
Kaboodle
Karelian Tales
Kipper
The Kwicky Koala Show
Lassie
Lassie's Rescue Rangers
The Legend of Tarzan
The Legends of Treasure Island
Leon the Fox
Little Bear
The Little Drummer Boy
Little Lord Fauntleroy (1976 series)
A Little Princess
The Little Rascals
Little Zoo
The Littlest Hobo
The Lone Ranger (1980 series)
Loopy de Loop
The Lost Islands
Ludwig
The Magic Boomerang
Magic Mike Tales
The Magic of Herself the Elf
The Magic Roundabout
Magilla Gorilla
Magpie
Matt and Jenny
Max and Moritz
Maya the Bee
Midnight is a Place
Mighty Mouse
Mighty Mouse and Friends
Mike and Angelo
Mike, Lu and Og
The Minikins
Mirror, Mirror
The Moonkys
Mopatop's Shop
Mort and Phil
Mr. Men
Mr. T
Muppet Babies
The Nargun and the Stars
NASCAR Racers
Nature Watch
Nellie the Elephant
Nestor, the Long-Eared Christmas Donkey
The New Adventures of Black Beauty
The New Adventures of Mighty Mouse and Heckle & Jeckle
The New Pink Panther Show
The New Woody Woodpecker Show
The New Shmoo
Nilus the Sandman: The Boy Who Dreamed Christmas
Noah's Island
Nobody's House
Noddy
Noggin the Nog
Ocean Girl
The Odyssey
Oggy and the Cockroaches
Oliver Twist
Once Upon a Time
Once Upon a Time... Life
Ovide Video
Paddington
Paint Along with Nancy
Pandamonium
Papa Beaver's Storytime
The Paper Lads
Park Ranger
The Patchwork Hero
Paw Paws
Pecola
Pepper Ann
Percy the Park Keeper
The Perils of Penelope Pitstop
Peter and the Magic Egg
Peter Pan (1976 musical)
The Phoenix and the Carpet
The Pied Piper of Hamelin
The Pink Panther
Pink Panther and Friends
The Pink Panther Show
The Pink Panther in: A Pink Christmas
Pip the Appleseed Knight
Pixie and Dixie and Mr. Jinks
Popeye
Postman Pat and the Barometer
Postman Pat and the Tuba
The Powerpuff Girls
Prince Cinders
Professor Moffett's Science Workshop
A Pup Named Scooby-Doo
The Puppy's Further Adventures
The Puppy's Great Adventure
The Puppy's New Adventures
Quack Pack
Quaq Quao
Quick Draw McGraw
The Raccoons
Raggedy Ann and Andy in The Great Santa Claus Caper
The Real Ghostbusters
The Real Story of...
The Red and the Blue
Redwall
Return of the Antelope
Revolting Rhymes
Ric the Raven
Ritter's Cove
The Road Runner Show
Road to Avonlea
Robotman & Friends
Rocket Power
Rockschool
Rocky Hollow
The Roman Holidays
Round the Bend
The Rovers
Rudolph the Red-Nosed Reindeer
Rugrats
Rupert
Runaway Ralph
Sabrina: The Animated Series
Santa's Christmas Snooze
Satellite City
Saturdee
Sea Urchins
The Secret Garden (TV series)
The Secret Garden (1987 film)
Secret Squirrel
The Secret World of Polly Flint
Sesame Street
Seven Little Australians
Scooby-Doo
Scooby-Doo, Where Are You!
Scooby and Scrappy-Doo
Scooby, Scrappy and Yabba-Doo
Scooby Goes Hollywood
Scooby's All-Star Laff-A-Lympics
Sheep in the Big City
Shingalana the Little Hunter
Shirt Tales
The Shoe People
The Silver Chair
Simon and the Witch
Skippy the Bush Kangaroo
Sky Pirates
The Smoggies
The Smurfs
Snacker
Snorks
The Snowman
Space Ghost and Dino Boy
Space Stars
Spider-Man
Spider-Woman
Sport Billy
Stig of the Dump
Stingray (1964 series)
Storybook International
Story Beneath the Sands
The Story of the Dancing Frog
Strawberry Shortcake in Big Apple City
Supergran
SuperTed
Super Chicken
Swallows and Amazons Forever!
The Swiss Family Robinson (1975 series)
T-Bag
Take Hart
Take Off
Tales of the Riverbank
Tarzan and the Super 7
Tarzan, Lord of the Jungle
Teenage Mutant Hero Turtles
Teletubbies
Tex Avery Cartoons
Thunderbirds
The Tiger and the Cat
Timothy Goes to School
Tiny Toon Adventures
The Tiny Tree
Tom and Jerry
Tom and Jerry Kids
Tom's Midnight Garden
The Tomorrow People (1992 series)
Top Cat
Tots TV
Touché Turtle and Dum Dum
Travellers by Night
Treasure Island
Tweenies
Ulysses 31
The Unbroken Arrow
Under the Mountain
The Untamed World
The Untouchables of Elliot Mouse
Valley of the Dinosaurs
Vision On
The Voyage of the Mimi
The Voyages of Doctor Dolittle
Walt Disney's Mickey and Donald
Watch Mr. Wizard
We All Have Tales
The Web
The White Stone
Widget
Wild, Wild World of Animals
Wildvision
The Wind in the Willows
Wizbit
The Wombles (1973 series)
The Wonderful World of Strawberry Shortcake
Woody Woodpecker
The Woody Woodpecker Show
The World of David the Gnome
The World of Jules Vernue
The World of Strawberry Shortcake
Worzel Gummidge
The Wuzzles
X-Men
Yogi Bear
Yogi Bear's All Star Comedy Christmas Caper
Yogi's Treasure Hunt
Zoom the White Dolphin

Special events
Ardfheis – The Leader's Speech
Budget coverage
Election coverage
Eurovision Song Contest and National Song Contest
FIFA World Cup (some coverage)
Olympic Games (some coverage)
People in Need Telethon
The Rose of Tralee
State funerals
State visits
The Late Late Toy Show

References

+
RTE
RTÉ history
Programmes broadcast by RTE
RTÉ Television